Louis Delarond Jorda (May 22, 1893 – May 27, 1964) was a professional baseball umpire who worked in the National League from 1927 to 1931 and again from 1940 to 1952.

Minor league playing career
He played in the minor leagues until 1916.

Umpiring career
In , Jorda started his umpiring career in the Cotton States League.

Over his 18-year big league umpiring career, Jorda umpired 2,509 major league games, in addition to working two All-Star Games (1941 and 1951), and  two World Series (1945, and 1949).

Later life
After his umpiring career, he was a partner in a beer distributorship with retired colleague Beans Reardon in southern California.

Jorda was one of the umpires featured in Norman Rockwell's famous painting Bottom of the Sixth, along with Reardon and Larry Goetz.

Death
Jorda died at his Florida home on May 27, 1964, just five days after his 71st birthday. He was survived by his wife, son and daughter.

See also 

 List of Major League Baseball umpires

References

1893 births
1964 deaths
Major League Baseball umpires
Sportspeople from Louisiana
Gadsden Steel Makers players
Griffin Lightfoots players
Fort Smith Twins players